Moyne may refer to:

 Baron Moyne, a title in the Peerage of the United Kingdom
 John Moyne, MP for Calne, Wiltshire, United Kingdom
 Moyne Kelly (1901–1988), American politician from Texas 
 Moyne, County Tipperary, a civil parish in the barony of Eliogarty, North Tipperary, Ireland
 Moyne, County Wicklow, a civil parish in County Wicklow, Ireland
 Moyne Abbey, County Mayo, Ireland
 Moyne Townland, County Mayo, Ireland
 Shire of Moyne, Victoria, Australia
 Moyne River

See also
 Moina (disambiguation)
 Lemoyne (disambiguation)
 Moynes Court, a Grade II* listed building in the village of Mathern, Monmouthshire, Wales